The Balama mine is one of the largest graphite mines in Mozambique and in the world. The mine is located in the northern part of the country in Cabo Delgado Province. The mine has estimated reserves of 1.15 billion tonnes of ore 10.2% graphite.

References 

Graphite mines in Mozambique